Plutomurus ortobalaganensis is the deepest terrestrial animal ever found on Earth, living at  below a cave entrance. 
It is a species of springtail (arthropods) endemic to the Krubera-Voronja cave system in Georgia. It was discovered in the CAVEX Team expedition of 2010. It feeds on a few fungi and decomposing organic matter in the caves.

Anatomy
It has a long antennae and is eyeless, it has a grayish body and has darker spots covering it.

References

Entomobryomorpha
Endemic fauna of Georgia (country)
Cave arthropods